Matthew Raymond Day (born 22 September 1987) is an Australian cricketer. He played three List A matches for Tasmania between 2010 and 2011.

See also
 List of Tasmanian representative cricketers

References

External links
 

1987 births
Living people
Australian cricketers
Tasmania cricketers
Sydney Thunder cricketers
Cricketers from Sydney